PT Nusantara Sejahtera Raya (d/b/a Cinema 21 or 21 Cineplex) is the largest cinema chain in Indonesia, serving 46 cities in the country.

Since its founding, 21 Cineplex has conducted a number of improvements and innovations, such as forming a cinema network with three separate brands, viz., Cinema 21, Cinema XXI and The Premiere to target different markets. Some cinemas offer Dolby Atmos and IMAX.

The Premiere 
The Premiere is targeted for audiences who wish for luxurious facilities in a cinema, and is not available at every branch.

References

External links
 Official website

Cinemas and movie theaters in Indonesia
Entertainment companies of Indonesia
Indonesian brands
1987 establishments in Indonesia